Appolo is a language spoken by the Nzema people of southwestern Ghana and southeast Ivory Coast.

Appolo may also refer to:

 Appolo F.C.; a soccer club in South Africa, see SAFA Second Division

See also
 Appollo (disambiguation)
 Apollo (disambiguation)
 Apolo (disambiguation)